Wang Quanzhang (born 15 February 1976) is a Chinese human rights lawyer from Wulian County, Shandong. He was arrested in August 2015 as part of the "709 crackdown" on human rights lawyers instigated by General Secretary of the Communist Party of China Xi Jinping, and after being held incommunicado for three years, he was put on trial for subversion of state power in December 2018.

Wang was released from prison on 4 April 2020 and was moved by authorities to his former residence in Jinan. The government has stated that Wang is being quarantined in precaution to the novel coronavirus, however it is feared that the virus has been used as an excuse to keep him under house arrest.

Career

Wang is a lawyer of the Beijing Fengrui Law Firm. He graduated from the School of Law at Shandong University in 2000, and worked for a time at the Shandong Provincial Library. In 2003, Wang passed the National Judicial Exam, and in 2007, formally began his lawyer career in Jinan, Shandong. He later moved to Beijing, where he specialized in human rights cases, defending victims subjected to land expropriation, labour camp mistreatment, and prison abuse. He also defended Falun Gong practitioners who have been subjected to ongoing nationwide persecution.

Wang also worked for the NGO Chinese Urgent Action Working Group, also known as 'China Action', which was co-founded in 2009 by Swedish human rights activist Peter Dahlin to assist, train and help Chinese lawyers, journalists and small NGOs work to promote the rule of law and to protect human rights in China. Dahlin was arrested in China in January 2016, and subsequently deported.

Harassment, arrest, and disappearance

Detention in April 2013

On 3 April 2013, after having defended a Falun Gong practitioner in a hearing at the Jingjiang City People's Court, Wang was detained for allegedly "disrupting court order". It was noted that prior to Wang's detention, he had been frequently denied access to his client since taking on the case. The defendant's family, who were waiting outside the court, were given no information about this incident. At 5 p.m on 4 April, the court put a statement on its website to inform that Wang had been placed under judicial custody. The statement mentions that Wang's violation was "serious", but it does not state what Wang had done.

Beating received in June 2015

On 18 June 2015, Wang defended some Falun Gong practitioners on trial in Liaocheng, Shandong, but the presiding judge Wang Yingjun constantly hindered his attempts to present legal arguments. Eventually the judge ordered him to be evicted from the court and he was then beaten by court officials.

Arrest and disappearance in August 2015

In August 2015 Wang was arrested as part of a nationwide crackdown on lawyers and human rights activists instigated by Communist Party general secretary Xi Jinping, known as the 709 crackdown, as it started on July 9, 2015. After his arrest, the authorities gave a notice of arrest to his wife, Li Wenzu, but refused to provide any information on where he was being held or to allow any access to him by his family or by a lawyer. For more than three years no information on his whereabouts or even whether he was dead or alive was forthcoming. By summer 2017, all the lawyers and activists arrested during the July 2015 crackdown, except for Wang, had either been released or sentenced to prison. Only the fate of Wang remained unknown.

Many of those arrested during the 2015 crackdown made forced confessions of guilt in court or on television, so Wang's wife, Li Wenzu, suggested that the reason why her husband had not been put on trial was that he refused to make any confession of guilt: "I think it might be because my husband hasn't compromised at all; that's why his case remains unsolved."

In April 2018, in order to publicize the disappearance of her husband a thousand days earlier, Li Wenzu embarked on a twelve-day walk from Beijing to Tianjin, where she thought Wang may have been held. Li was accompanied on her march to Tianjin by Wang Qiaoling, the wife of lawyer Li Heping, who had also been arrested as part of the crackdown, and had been given a suspended sentence in April 2017. Li Wenzu was stopped from completing the march by the authorities.

In July 2018, almost three years after his disappearance, Wang was finally allowed access to a lawyer, Liu Weiguo. According to Liu, Wang had not suffered any "hard violence" during his detention, which Li Wenzu interpreted to mean that he was subjected to other forms of mistreatment such as sleep deprivation and forced medication: "When Quanzhang said that he did not suffer hard violence, he was trying to tell me that he suffered inhuman torment!"

In mid-December 2018, Li Wenzu and three other women publicly shaved their heads in the streets of Beijing as a protest against the continuing detention of Wang Quanzhang without trial.

Trial

Wang was finally put on trial for subverting state power at the No. 2 Intermediate People's Court in Tianjin on 26 December 2018, some three and a half years after his initial disappearance. Court documents accuse Wang of working with the Swedish human rights activist Peter Dahlin and others to "train hostile forces". Some activists and supporters were present outside the court, including Yang Chunlin, Zhang Zhecheng, and Xu Yan (wife of the detained lawyer Yu Wenshang), but they were forcibly removed or detained. Foreign journalists and diplomats were also denied entry to the courtroom. Wang's wife, Li Wenzu, was unable to attend the trial as she was prohibited from leaving her apartment in Beijing at 5 am on the day of the trial by security officials.

Within minutes of the trial starting on 26 December, Wang fired his court-appointed lawyer, causing the case to be immediately adjourned to an unspecified date so that another lawyer could be appointed for him. Commenting on this development, Dahlin said: "Wang is unlikely to get to choose his own lawyer, but this move will highlight the lack of any real trial being made available to him – that this is a show trial and nothing more". Protesters who had gathered outside the court in support of Wang were quickly removed by security police.

On 28 December 2018, Li Wenzu and two other wives of detained lawyers (Yuan Shanshan 原珊珊, wife of Xie Yanyi 謝燕益, and Wang Xiaoling 王峭嶺, wife of Li Heping) tried to present a petition to the Supreme People's Court at Hongsicun in Chaoyang District, Beijing, protesting the handling of her husband's case by the Tianjin court. However, about fifty security officials surrounded her, and stopped her from entering the court building. She stated that she would try again the following week.

On 28 January 2019 it was announced that Wang had been found guilty of subverting state power, and had been sentenced to four and half years in prison.

Imprisonment
In June 2019 Wang Quanzhang's wife Li Wenzu, and elder sister Wang Quanxiu, together with his son Quanquan, visited Wang in Linyi Prison in Shandong for half an hour. According to Li "he resembled nothing more than a well-programmed but rather dull wooden man" who barely interacted with them. Another visit by Li in December 2019 was put off by authorities by a week, which another attorney ascribed to an intention of authorities to have the visit coincide with the Christmas holiday season to deflect the attention of international media. Li expressed concerns about the mental health of her husband having deteriorated since her previous visit.

Release
Wang Quanzong was released from prison on 4 April 2020 after having served his sentence in full. Authorities moved him to his former residence in the eastern city of Jinan for two weeks starting from 4 April 2020 as a precautionary measure against the novel coronavirus. His wife told newspapers that she suspected the government had used the virus as an excuse to quarantine him when in fact their intentions were to keep him under house arrest.

See also
 Human rights in China
 List of Chinese dissidents
 Wang Yu, another lawyer arrested in July 2015

References

External links
 Statement on Wang Quanzhang’s indictment by Peter Dahlin

1976 births
Chinese dissidents
Chinese human rights activists
20th-century Chinese lawyers
21st-century Chinese lawyers
Chinese prisoners and detainees
Living people
People from Wulian